Psorosa flavifasciella is a species of snout moth. It is found in Spain and Portugal.

The wingspan is about 22 mm.

References

Moths described in 1901
Phycitini